Johnny Crum (1 January 1912 in Glasgow – 6 July 1969) was a Scottish footballer, who played for Celtic, Greenock Morton and Scotland.

References

Sources

External links 
 
 London Hearts profile
 Profile at The Celtic Wiki

1912 births
1969 deaths
Scottish footballers
Scotland international footballers
Association football forwards
Footballers from Glasgow
Celtic F.C. players
Greenock Morton F.C. players
Ashfield F.C. players
Maryhill Harp F.C. players
Scottish Football League players
Scottish Football League representative players
Scotland junior international footballers
Scottish Junior Football Association players
Place of death missing